The electoral district of Devon was a single-member electoral district of the Tasmanian House of Assembly. It was based in the north coastal and north-western regions of Tasmania, and its major town was Devonport.

The seat was created ahead of the Assembly's first election held in 1856, and was abolished at the 1871 election, being split into the electorates of Wellington, East Devon and West Devon.

Members for Devon

References
 
 
 Parliament of Tasmania (2006). The Parliament of Tasmania from 1956

Devon